JK She'salady is a Standardbred pacing mare foaled in 2012 by Art Major and out of Presidential Lady. During her career she recorded 13 wins in 16 starts, capping it off with the prestigious Breeders Crown 2YO Filly Pace. Her lifetime earnings were $972,730. JK She'salady was harness racing's Horse of the Year in Canada  and the United States for 2014.

On September 24, her trainer Nancy Johansson announced that she had been retired due to a bacterial lung infection. JK Shesalady will become a broodmare.

References

Canadian Standardbred racehorses
2012 racehorse births
Harness Horse of the Year winners
American Champion harness horses